"The Winchester Tapes" is an episode from the TV series M*A*S*H. The sixth episode of the sixth season, it originally aired on CBS October 18, 1977, with a repeat on December 27, 1977, and was written by Everett Greenbaum and Jim Fritzell and directed by Burt Metcalfe.

The guest cast is Thomas Carter as a patient and Kimiko Hiroshige as the Korean woman.

Overview
Major Winchester records a taped message to his parents, begging them to do whatever it takes to get him reassigned from the 4077th.

Plot

The episode is primarily Major Winchester's recurring taped conversation to his parents in Boston, interspersed with scenes supporting his assessments of his co-workers and the incidents therein.  It begins with Hawkeye begging Winchester to take officer of the day duty so he can spend a weekend in Seoul with a nurse.  Winchester refuses at first, but then relents only to stop Hawkeye's incessant begging.

Winchester then proceeds to describe the co-workers to his parents, in this order:

• Colonel Potter - "a tough, bandy-legged little mustang", but "he paints."  While posing for a portrait for Potter, Winchester begins to beg for a transfer, but Potter refuses.  The exchange between Potter and Winchester escalates, and Potter emphatically ends it by telling Winchester he will not be transferred as he completes the painting of Winchester with his mouth open.

• Radar O'Reilly - a "myopic farmboy" responsible for the day-to-day operations of the 4077th.  Winchester attempts to bribe Radar with a case of Grape Nehi into using the camp telephone to call Tokyo (presumably Colonel Baldwin, who had him sent to the 4077th) to arrange a transfer.  When Radar tells him he is not allowed to use the phone for this purpose per Potter's orders, Winchester angrily removes the Grape Nehi.

• Major Houlihan - a "head nurse who is part seductress and part Atilla the Hun".

• Father Mulcahy - a "cock-eyed optimist who sounds like Dennis Day".

• B. J. Hunnicutt - a "relatively inoffensive chap".  B.J. pulls a prank on Winchester by switching his uniform pants first with those of a heavier soldier, prompting Winchester to overeat.  Soon after, B.J. switches the pants to those of a thinner soldier, prompting Winchester to jog around the compound in an attempt to lose weight.  After he leaves to jog, B.J. quips to Hawkeye, "Tomorrow, he gets taller!"

In a subplot, Hawkeye's repeated attempts to embark on his weekend in Seoul are interrupted by his surgical duties.  When he is finally able to leave after a 38-hour surgery session, he is too tired to go and falls asleep on his cot.  Winchester then concludes his tape to his parents as follows:

"Finally, a peaceful moment to conclude this tape.  The would-be lothario Pierce is fast asleep, and the 38-hour day is done."

As he continues speaking, he tries to pour himself a cup of tea but is unable.  He opens his teapot to find his tea has been replaced by a rubber chicken.  He concludes the tape by saying, "Now, Mother and Dad, I will put this as eloquently and succinctly as I can...get me the hell out of here!"

External links
 

M*A*S*H (season 6) episodes
1977 American television episodes